Healthcare in West Bengal features a universal health care system run by the state and the federal governments. The Constitution of India charges every state with "raising of the level of nutrition and the standard of living of its people and the improvement of public health as among its primary duties". Ministry of Health & Family Welfare of the Government of West Bengal is responsible for administering and funding the public hospital system in the state. The entire state population is covered by a health insurance, either provided by their employer or the Employees’ State Insurance (if the employee’s salary is up Rs 21000/month). Other categories of people (low-income, self-employed, the unemployed or the retired etc.) are covered under the state’s public health insurance scheme (Swasthya Sathi). An additional , outside the official health budget, was to be spent on health insurance coverage for the current and retired employees of the state government. Healthcare forms roughly 4.5% of the state's entire budget which critics say should be increased to at least 8% in line with the National Health Policy.

Healthcare infrastructure
The health care infrastructure is divided into three tiers — the primary health-care network, a secondary care system comprising district and sub-divisional hospitals and tertiary hospitals providing specialty and super specialty care. A Chief Medical Officer of Health (C.M.O.H.) heads each of the eighteen districts. The  responsibility of CMOH is to manage the primary health care sector and ensure the effective implementation of the various medical, health and family welfare programmes. The secondary level hospitals (sub-divisional and district hospitals) are headed by superintendents who report to the C.M.O.H. and are accountable to a hospital management committee. At the block level, the Block Medical Officer of Health (BMOH) is responsible for providing services and for monitoring and supervising the primary health centres and health programme implementation.

West Bengal Health Service provides the health care professionals for the statewide infrastructure, while Medical Education Service employs teachers at the training institutions.

The number and beds sanctioned in different types of healthcare setup, as published by the government of West Bengal, are in the following table. In this table, hospitals under other departments of state government include government undertaking organisations, and rural hospitals include those ones which were upgraded from block primary health centre.

Healthcare indices
Following table illustrates some health care indicators of the state, compared to the national indicator, and comparison with some major states that fared better than West Bengal (states with population 20 millions or more as of 2011 national census were considered as major states for this table). These data are based on Sample Registration System of Office of the Registrar General and Census Commissioner, India.

Healthcare issues

References

Health in West Bengal